Elvik is a surname. Notable people with the surname include:

Åsa Elvik (born 1979), Norwegian politician
Kjersti Elvik (born 1969), Norwegian actress

Norwegian-language surnames